Streptomyces tateyamensis is a bacterium species from the genus of Streptomyces which has been isolated from the sponge Haliclona from the pacific coastline of the city Tateyama in the Chiba prefecture in Japan. Streptomyces tateyamensis produces the antibiotic thiopeptin B.

See also 
 List of Streptomyces species

References

Further reading

External links
Type strain of Streptomyces tateyamensis at BacDive -  the Bacterial Diversity Metadatabase	

tateyamensis
Bacteria described in 2010